Gowjar (also known as Gūhjahr, Gujur, Kūh Jahr, and Kūjūr) is a village in Ravar Rural District, in the Central District of Ravar County, Kerman Province, Iran. At the 2006 census, its population was 537, in 156 families.

References 

Populated places in Ravar County